Van Alstyne is a Dutch surname also found as "Van Alstine". Notable people with the surname include:

Benjamin Van Alstyne (1893–1972), American basketball coach
Egbert Anson Van Alstyne (1878–1951), songwriter
Frances van Alstyne (1820–1915), usually known as Fanny Crosby, American hymnwriter
Henry A. Van Alstyne (1869–1947), New York engineer and surveyor
James Van Alstyne (born 1966), professional poker player
Marshall Van Alstyne (born 1962), academic
Thomas J. Van Alstyne (1827–1903), U.S. Representative from New York
William Van Alstyne (1934-2019), constitutional law scholar and professor at William & Mary Law School

See also
Van Alstyne, Texas

References

Surnames of Dutch origin